The Bendoc River is a perennial river of the Snowy River catchment, located in the Alpine regions of the states of Victoria and New South Wales, Australia.

Course and features
The river descends  over its  course.

Etymology
The name of the river is believed to be derived from a dock that was located on the river in Victoria, adjacent to a pastoral lease held by Benjamin Boyd. The dock was named "Ben's Dock". However, there was a lack of uniformity in the spelling, variously as Bendoc or Bendock, in relation to a mountain, the river, a parish, and the town near the Victoria and New South Wales borders. In 1966, the Shire of Orbost informed the Victorian government that local sentiment wished to retain the spelling Bendoc. The matter was finalised when the decision of the Minister of Lands was published in the Victoria Government Gazette on 29 May 1968, proclaiming the town and river to be spelt Bendoc.

See also

 List of rivers of New South Wales (A–K)
 List of rivers of Australia
 Rivers of New South Wales

References

External links
 
 

East Gippsland catchment
Rivers of Gippsland (region)
Rivers of New South Wales
Snowy Mountains